Yoo Jung-hyun (born October 24, 1967) is a South Korean television personality and politician. He was a cast member in the reality show The Genius: Rule Breaker and The Genius: Grand Final.

References

External links

1967 births
Living people
South Korean announcers
South Korean television personalities
Members of the National Assembly (South Korea)
Liberty Korea Party politicians
Yonsei University alumni
Ryu clan of Munhwa